Food in the Belly is the third studio album by Xavier Rudd, released in October 2005. It peaked at No. 16 on the ARIA Albums Chart, and reached the top 100 in Belgium and Netherlands. It earned Rudd a nomination for ARIA Award for Best Blues and Roots Album at the ARIA Music Awards of 2006 ceremony, but lost to the Audreys' Between Last Night and Us.

Track listing

Charts

Certifications

References

External links
 Undercover review
 Xavier Rudd Article on Straight.com

2005 albums
Anti- (record label) albums
Xavier Rudd albums